Yachuli is a village in the Indian state of Arunachal Pradesh. Lower Subansiri is the name of the district that contains village Yachuli.

It is one of the 60 constituencies of Legislative Assembly of Arunachal Pradesh. The current Member of the Legislative Assembly for this constituency is Er. Taba Tedir.

See also
List of constituencies of Arunachal Pradesh Legislative Assembly
Arunachal Pradesh Legislative Assembly

References

Villages in Lower Subansiri district